Student assistant may mean:

 A student member of a college coaching staff
 A student teaching assistant
 Resident assistant, a trained peer leader, within a college, university, or group housing facility

Academic terminology